Heissler is a surname. Notable people with the surname include:

 Carl Heissler (1823–1878), Austrian violinist and violist
 Drew Heissler, better known as Pokey LaFarge, American bluegrass singer
 Donat John Count Heissler of Heitersheim (1648–1696), Impérial and Royal Marshal ( KK) of the Austria-Hungary empire
 Déborah Heissler (born 1976), French author

See also
 Heisler

Jewish surnames
German-language surnames